Bila Yarrudhanggalangdhuray is a 2021 historical novel by Anita Heiss. Set around the time of Gundagai's flood of 1852, it concerns the life of a young Wiradjuri woman, Wagadhaany, the daughter of Yarri, and her relationships with her colonial masters, and her people who live near Murrumbidya.

Reception
A review in Australian Book Review of Bila Yarrudhanggalangdhuray wrote "With its strong emotional pull and its accessible female hero, this novel deserves wide appeal.". A reviewer for Guardian Australia called it "a novel of the myopia and cruelty of “good” intentions." and "a joyful love story, and a literary celebration of the Wiradyuri language, which is woven throughout."

Bila Yarrudhanggalangdhuray has also been reviewed by The Sydney Morning Herald, The West Australian, Books+Publishing, The Canberra Times, LSJ, and The Saturday Paper.

References

External links
Library holdings of Bila Yarrudhanggalangdhuray
Interview with Heiss about Bila Yarrudhanggalangdhuray

2021 Australian novels
Australian historical novels
Indigenous Australian literature
Novels set in New South Wales
Simon & Schuster books
Fiction set in 1852
Novels set in the 1850s
Gundagai